Control is the third full-length album by Pedro the Lion. It was released on April 16, 2002 on Jade Tree Records.  It is a concept album about a businessman who is having an extramarital affair, and his untimely death at the hands of his spurned wife.  It covers such subject matter as infidelity, parenthood, greed, commercialism, vengeance, and fear of death.

Track listing
All songs by Bazan except "Penetration" "Magazine" and "Second Best", which were co-written with Casey Foubert.
"Options" – 3:56
"Rapture" – 3:26
"Penetration" – 3:55
"Indian Summer" – 3:21
"Progress" – 4:09
"Magazine" – 4:01
"Rehearsal" – 3:48
"Second Best" – 6:00
"Priests And Paramedics" – 4:35
"Rejoice" – 3:11

Personnel
David Bazan – vocals, drums, guitars, bass guitar, keyboards
Casey Foubert – bass guitar, keyboards, guitars, percussion
Design and Illustration by Ryan Clark for Asterik Studio

References

Pedro the Lion albums
2002 albums
Concept albums
Jade Tree (record label) albums